Missed Call is a 2005 Indian English language film directed by Mridul Toolsidas and Vinay Subramaniam duo. The film was shot on 16mm in 15 days on shoe-string budget. Shot in cinema verite style with on location sync- sound, it went on to becoming Opening Film at Indian Panorama section of the 36th International Film Festival of India, and featured in World Cinema India section at the 60th Cannes Film Festival.  Missed Call garnered Best International Film at the Israel Film Festival, United States. Missed Call was adjudicated the Best International Film at the Red Sea International Film Festival in 2008. The film was honored with Films Division of India's "Best of Indian Cinema."

Plot 
The protagonist, a 20-something Gaurav Sengupta (Ankur Vikal) is obsessed with the idea of capturing every moment in life on celluloid and narrates the story as seen through his eyes. It is his journey from joy to despair, from hope to frustration and from love to lust.

Production 
The movie was produced by Reelism Films and was their debut production. The movie was directed by the director duo, Mridul Toolsidas and Vinay Subramanian.

Cast 
 Ankur Vikal as Gaurav Sengpupta
 Salim Ghouse as Arindam Kumar Sengputa 
 Heeba Shah as Gayatri
 Ram Kapoor as Vinay Murthy
 Tinnu Anand as DK Bose
 Seema Rahmani as Rose

Reviews 
Strikingly original and darkly humorous, MISSED CALL is told in a captivating, vérité style that makes this directorial debut a must see for independent film aficionados worldwide.
 It boasts delightfully realistic performances and witty writing that capture the passion, pain and promise of urban youth navigating the rocky road toward adulthood. - Indian Film Festival 

"Missed Call" is a cutting example of niche cinema getting as close to the urban reality about the average bourgeois youngster as a camera can possibly take the audience. But at the end of the day the sense of aimlessness that overwhelms Gaurav Sengupta is much too familiar to connect with the audience as anything but an odd film about a square among circles. - WebIndia 123

"The film is about a filmmaker, his fight, his defeat, his eccentricities, his creativity and a burning passion for the medium. The directors sure deserve kudos because its a story that needs to be told."

References

External links
 
 
 Reelism Films

2005 films
2000s Hindi-language films
Desi films
Indian documentary films
English-language Indian films
Indian independent films
Indian avant-garde and experimental films